Richard Ryder may refer to:

 Richard D. Ryder  (born 1940), British psychologist and animal rights advocate
 Richard Ryder, Baron Ryder of Wensum (born 1949), British Conservative Party British politician and current member of the House of Lords
 Richard Ryder (politician, born 1766) (1766–1832), British politician
 Richard Ryder (actor) (1942–1995), actor who guest starred in Star Trek: Deep Space Nine and other television shows and movies
 Nova (Richard Rider), a Marvel Comics superhero whose name is often misspelled as Ryder
 Richard Ryder (comedian), Canadian comedian and broadcaster